Patricia Hall may refer to:

 Patricia Hall (athlete) (born 1982), Jamaican sprinter
 Patricia Hall (novelist) (born 1940), pseudonym used by journalist Maureen O'Connor
 Pat Hall (1917–2010), British ornithologist
 Sister Pat Hall, American backing singer on the 1974 T.Rex album Zinc Alloy and the Hidden Riders of Tomorrow